The Democratic Patriots' Unified Party, formerly the Democratic Patriots' Movement, is a communist party in Tunisia. Established in 1981, the movement was only legalised in 2011 after the Tunisian Revolution. The movement primarily advocates a parliamentary system, the balanced development of the peasantry and light industry, and campaigns against the exploitation of the working classes of Tunisia. In the 2011 elections, they won one seat in the Constituent Assembly of Tunisia, Mongi Rahoui from Jendouba Constituency. In October 2012, the party formed a leftist coalition, the Popular Front, with the Workers' Party, the Tunisian Green Party, the Movement of Socialist Democrats, the Tunisian Ba'ath Movement (an Iraqi-led branch of the Ba'ath Party), and other Progressive parties. The Movement is strongly anti-Islamist.

Its secretary-general, Chokri Belaid, was shot dead on 6 February 2013.

References

1982 establishments in Tunisia
Arab nationalism in Tunisia
Arab nationalist political parties
Communist parties in Tunisia
Formerly banned political parties in Tunisia
Formerly banned communist parties
Political parties established in 1982
Popular Front (Tunisia)